The International Conference of Marxist–Leninist Parties and Organizations (ICMLPO) is a name used by two unrelated networks of communist groups:

 International Conference of Marxist–Leninist Parties and Organizations (International Newsletter): A now defunct grouping of parties and organizations which adhered to Marxism–Leninism–Mao Zedong Thought. Main organizer was the Marxist–Leninist Party of Germany.
 International Conference of Marxist–Leninist Parties and Organizations (Unity & Struggle): A grouping of parties and organizations that uphold the line of Enver Hoxha and the Party of Labour of Albania.